The list of winners below is generated using the Roll of Honour from the Munster Ladies Gaelic Athletic Association club website. Munster clubs have the best record of all the provinces in the All Ireland Club Championship with 19 wins, spread across seven clubs, from three counties.

Key

By year

By Club

colours are of the club as it exists now. St Endas & Slievenamon have assumed their county colours for now.

By County

References

Ladies' Gaelic football competitions
Ladies'